General Shopping is a Brazilian shopping mall management company headquartered in São Paulo and founded in 1989. The company has 221.2 thousand m² of gross lettable area (GLA) and has 16 shopping centers in operation. Together, these developments have 312.9 thousand m² of GLA, being 255.0 thousand m² of GLA.

References 

Real estate companies established in 1989
Real estate companies of Brazil
Companies based in São Paulo
Companies listed on B3 (stock exchange)
Shopping center management firms